The Rapid Intervention Battalion (Bataillon d'Intervention Rapide, or BIR) is an elite military force and an army combat unit of the Cameroonian Armed Forces.

The unit is supported by the United States, reports directly to the president of Cameroon, and has played a large part in the Cameroonian and regional war against Boko Haram. The unit has also been accused of torturing and killing detainees at a number of its bases in northern Cameroon and in Nigeria.

Structure and activities

The BIR was created in 2001 in Cameroon's struggle against armed groups and gangs on its borders.

The BIR is better equipped, trained and paid than ordinary units in Cameroon's army. The unit is led by a retired Israeli officer and reports directly to Cameroon's president, instead of to the ministry of defense. The BIR has worked closely with the US military since 2007 or earlier.

A part of the BIR's objectives includes controlling the illegal circulation of arms. The BIR has also been cited by poachers and ivory traders as a threat to illegal trade in animal goods.

In 2016, the BIR participated in the US- and AFRICOM- sponsored Exercise Obangame and Saharan Express wargames, meant to increase regional military cooperation between central African nations and the United States. The BIR hosted a significant portion of the exercises, involving 32 nations including the UK, France and Germany, at its base in Idenau.

Operation Alpha

The BIR has launched Operation Alpha, a counterterrorism campaign against Boko Haram that has received international support. The operation's efforts have been central to the war waged by Cameroon, Nigeria, Niger and Chad against Boko Haram.

The operation's headquarters are in Salak. According to Amnesty International, Salak is also used as an illegal prison to house persons detained by the BIR.

The BIR also conducts operations from the border town of Fotokol in Nigeria, where it converted a closed school into a military base. In 2016, approximately 1000 BIR soldiers were reported to have captured the town of Kumshe, Nigeria from Boko Haram.

Foreign support

The BIR has received equipment and training from the United States and Israel. In the spring of 2016, US Ambassador to Cameroon Michael Hoza praised the unit, stating, "In their training, conduct, and leadership, the BIR exhibited all of the values we expect in our own armed forces — professionalism, protection of the civilian population, and respect for human rights." The US military has confirmed that works with the BIR in the fight against Boko Haram, and has stated that approximately 300 US military personnel are working with the BIR at any given time.

Michael Page, a former US state department and intelligence analyst, has described the BIR as a Cameroonian "army within-an-army" for the United States.

Accusations of human rights abuses

Amnesty International has accused the BIR of torturing detainees, supporting these accusations with leaked videos of soldiers wearing BIR uniforms and torturing detainees. The organization has stated that the detainees are primarily men of military age, Muslim, and of Kanuri ethnicity, but that women and children have also been held. Both men and women have been tortured. Tortured detainees have testified that American soldiers were present at BIR bases where they were detained. Every year since 2010, the US State Department has issued a report accusing the BIR of human rights abuses including killings and assaults.

In 2017, the U.S. Army began an inquiry into the torture allegations at the request of General Thomas Waldhauser, the commander of AFRICOM.

Footage analyzed by BBC Africa Eye has shown BIR soldiers burning a house down in the Azi village of Southwest Region. Cameroon's Communication Minister Issa Tchiroma Bakary denied that the men were actually BIR soldiers, instead claiming that they were separatists in captured uniforms. An OSINT investigation by individuals associated with bellingcat, and Amnesty International, linked the BIR to the execution of women and children, believed to be in Mayo-Tsanaga.

See also
Boko Haram insurgency
Anglophone Crisis

References

Military of Cameroon